The year 2016 was the 4th year in the history of the Absolute Championship Berkut, a mixed martial arts promotion based in Russia. 2016 started with Absolute Championship Berkut 29 . It started broadcasting through a television agreement with  Match TV.

List of events

Mixed martial arts

Kickboxing

ACB 29: Poland

Absolute Championship Berkut 29: Poland was a mixed martial arts event held by Absolute Championship Berkut on February 6, 2016, at the Hala Torwar in Warsaw, Poland.

Results

ACB 30: Young Eagles 5

Absolute Championship Berkut 30: Young Eagles 5 was a mixed martial arts event held by Absolute Championship Berkut on February 20, 2016, at the Arena Coliseum in Grozny, Russia.

Results

ACB KB 5: Let's Knock The Winter Out

Absolute Championship Berkut Kickboxing 5: Let's Knock The Winter Out was a Kickboxing event held by Absolute Championship Berkut on February 27, 2016, at the Grinn Center in Orel, Russia.

Results

ACB 31: Magomedsharipov vs. Arapkhanov

Absolute Championship Berkut 31: Magomedsharipov vs. Arapkhanov was a mixed martial arts event held by Absolute Championship Berkut on March 9, 2016, at the Arena Coliseum in Grozny, Russia.

Results

ACB 32: The Battle of Lions

Absolute Championship Berkut 32: The Battle of Lions was a mixed martial arts event held by Absolute Championship Berkut on March 26, 2016, at the Dynamo Palace of Sports in Krylatskoye in Moscow, Russia.

Results

ACB 33: Young Eagles 6

Absolute Championship Berkut 33: Young Eagles 6 was a mixed martial arts event held by Absolute Championship Berkut on April 16, 2016, at the Arena Coliseum in Grozny, Russia.

Results

ACB 34: Young Eagles 7

Absolute Championship Berkut 34: Young Eagles 7 was a mixed martial arts event held by Absolute Championship Berkut on April 29, 2016, at the Arena Coliseum in Grozny, Russia.

Results

ACB 35: In Memory of Guram Gugenishvili

Absolute Championship Berkut 35: In Memory of Guram Gugenishvili was a mixed martial arts event held by Absolute Championship Berkut on May 6, 2016, at the Tbilisi Sports Palace in Tbilisi, Georgia.

Results

ACB 36: Young Eagles 8

Absolute Championship Berkut 36: Young Eagles 8 was a mixed martial arts event held by Absolute Championship Berkut on May 10, 2016, at the Sports Hall Coliseum in Grozny, Russia.

Results

ACB 37: Young Eagles 9

Absolute Championship Berkut 37: Young Eagles 9 was a mixed martial arts event held by Absolute Championship Berkut on May 11, 2016, at the Sports Hall Coliseum in Grozny, Russia.

Results

ACB 38: Breakthrough

Absolute Championship Berkut 38: Breakthrough was a mixed martial arts event held by Absolute Championship Berkut on May 20, 2016, at the KSK "Ekspress" in Rostov-on-Don, Russia.

Results

ACB 39: Young Eagles 10

Absolute Championship Berkut 39: Young Eagles 10 was a mixed martial arts event held by Absolute Championship Berkut on May 28, 2016, at the Kristall Ice Sports Palace  in Saratov, Russia.

Results

ACB 40: Battleground

Absolute Championship Berkut 40: Battleground was a mixed martial arts event held by Absolute Championship Berkut on June 3, 2016, at the Sports Palace Olymp in Krasnodar, Russia.

Results

ACB KB 6: Battle in Brussels

Absolute Championship Berkut Kickboxing 6: Battle in Brussels was a Kickboxing event held by Absolute Championship Berkut on June 5, 2016, at the Sporthal Merchtem in Brussels, Belgium.

Results

ACB 41: The Path to Triumph

Absolute Championship Berkut 41: The Path to Triumph was a mixed martial arts event held by Absolute Championship Berkut on July 15, 2016, at the Adler Arena in Sochi, Russia.

Results

ACB 42: Young Eagles 11

Absolute Championship Berkut 42: Young Eagles 11 was a mixed martial arts event held by Absolute Championship Berkut on August 10, 2016, at the Sports Palace "Manezh" in Vladikavkaz, Russia.

Results

ACB 43: Battle of the Sura

Absolute Championship Berkut 43: Battle of the Sura was a mixed martial arts event held by Absolute Championship Berkut on August 20, 2016, at the Dizel Arena in Penza, Russia.

Results

ACB 44: Young Eagles 12

Absolute Championship Berkut 44: Young Eagles 12 was a mixed martial arts event held by Absolute Championship Berkut on September 3, 2016, at the Volgograd Arena in Volgograd, Russia.

Results

ACB 45: Magomedsharipov vs. Silva

Absolute Championship Berkut 45: Magomedsharipov vs. Silva was a mixed martial arts event held by Absolute Championship Berkut on September 17, 2016, at the Ice Palace in Saint Petersburg, Russia.

Background
Khamzaev actually won the fight via unanimous decision, but after the statement of Mairbek Khasiev about the simulation by Khamzaev - the result of the fight was changed.

Results

ACB KB 7: Bloody Night

Absolute Championship Berkut Kickboxing 7: Bloody Night was a Kickboxing event held by Absolute Championship Berkut on September 18, 2016, at the Horia Demian Sports Hall in Cluj-Napoca, Romania.

Results

ACB 46: Olsztyński Legion - Young Eagles 13

Absolute Championship Berkut 46: Olsztyński Legion - Young Eagles 13 was a mixed martial arts event held by Absolute Championship Berkut on September 24, 2016, at the Hala Urania in Olsztyn, Poland.

Results

ACB 47: Braveheart - Young Eagles 14

Absolute Championship Berkut 47: Braveheart - Young Eagles 14 was a mixed martial arts event held by Absolute Championship Berkut on October 1, 2016, at the SSE Hydro in Glasgow, Scotland.

Results

ACB KB 8: Only The Braves

Absolute Championship Berkut Kickboxing 8: Only The Braves was a Kickboxing event held by Absolute Championship Berkut on October 16, 2016, at the Sportcomplex Koning Willem-Alexander in Hoofddorp, Netherlands.

Results

ACB 48: Revenge

Absolute Championship Berkut 48: Revenge was a mixed martial arts event held by Absolute Championship Berkut on October 22, 2016, at the Dynamo Palace of Sports in Krylatskoye in Moscow, Russia.

Results

ACB 49: Rostov Onslaught

Absolute Championship Berkut 49: Rostov Onslaught was a mixed martial arts event held by Absolute Championship Berkut on November 26, 2016, at the Sport-Don Sports Palace in Rostov-on-Don, Russia.

Background

Bonus awards:
 
The following fighters were awarded $5,000 bonuses:
Fight of the Night: Eduard Vartanyan vs Alexandr Shabliy
Knockout of the Night: Alexander Peduson
Submission of the Night: Anthony Leone

Results

ACB 50: Stormbringer

Absolute Championship Berkut 50: Stormbringer was a mixed martial arts event held by Absolute Championship Berkut on December 18, 2016, at the Sibur Arena in Saint Petersburg, Russia.

Background
A Lightweight bout between Musa Khamanaev and Saul Rogers was scheduled for this card. However, the fight was cancelled in early December due to an injury sustained by Rogers, the bout will be Rescheduled.

Vyacheslav Vasilevsky Not Medically Cleared to fight, his bout with Albert Duraev was canceled.

Bonus awards:
 
The following fighters were awarded $10,000 bonuses:
Fight of the Night: Marcelo Alfaya vs Beslan IsaevKnockout of the Night: Aleksei ButorinSubmission of the Night: Magomed Magomedov'''

Results

References

Absolute Championship Akhmat
2016 in mixed martial arts
Absolute Championship Berkut events